Shandong Vocational College of Science and Technology (SVCST) is a post-secondary institution in Weifang, Shandong.

 it had 16,000 full-time students. Its two campuses are Fuyan Mountain Campus and Binhai Campus. It was established in 1978.

References

External links
 Shandong Vocational College of Science and Technology
 Shandong Vocational College of Science and Technology 

Universities and colleges in Shandong
1978 establishments in China
Educational institutions established in 1978
Weifang